The House Opposite (French: La maison d'en face) is a 1937 French comedy film directed by Christian-Jaque and Elvire Popesco, André Lefaur and Pierre Stéphen.

The film's sets were designed by the art director Roland Quignon.

Cast
Elvire Popesco as Madame Anna 
André Lefaur as Monsieur Pic 
Pierre Stéphen as Mouche 
André Berley as Renaudeau 
Pauline Carton as Aglaé
Christiane Delyne as Gaby Duc 
Paul Faivre as Maringot 
Louis Florencie as Le contrôleur des contributions 
Anthony Gildès as Monval 
Milly Mathis as Louise 
Guy Parzy as Albert Pic 
Marthe Sarbel as La concierge 
Laure Senty as Hortense Pic

References

External links

1937 films
French comedy films
1937 comedy films
1930s French-language films
Films directed by Christian-Jaque
French black-and-white films
1930s French films